Santurce (from the Basque Santurtzi which means Saint George) is a barrio or district in the municipality of San Juan. Its population in 2020 was 69,469. It is also the biggest and most populated of all the barrios in the capital city with a bigger population than most municipalities of Puerto Rico and one of the most densely populated areas of the island (13,257.4 persons per square mile).

Geography

Geographically speaking, Santurce is a peninsula that is attached to the mainland in the east, where it borders with the Isla Verde district of Carolina. It is 7.6 km long from west to east, and up to 3.0 km wide in the eastern part. The peninsula is bounded by the Atlantic Ocean in the north, with more than five km of beaches from the Condado peninsula in the west, to a point 600 m east of Punta Las Marías, where it borders on the Isla Verde area, and Laguna San José and its northern embayment, Laguna Los Corozos to the east.

To the south is the Martín Peña Channel, which separates Santurce from the northern barrios of former municipio Río Piedras: Hato Rey Norte, Hato Rey Central, and Oriente. To the west is San Juan Bay, where three bridges, Dos Hermanos Bridge (Ave. Ashford), G. Esteves Bridge (Ave. Ponce de León) and San Antonio Bridge (Ave. Fernandes Juncos) connect Santurce with La Isleta (small island) where Old San Juan is located.

The topography is mainly flat with low hills toward the central areas and swampy areas to the south along the Martín Peña Channel and to the east near the Laguna San José (San José Lagoon).

Location
Santurce is located along the north-eastern coast of Puerto Rico. It lies south of the Atlantic Ocean, east of Old San Juan and west of Isla Verde. It is surrounded by six bodies of water: San Juan Bay, Condado Natural Lagoon, the Martín Peña Channel, San José Lagoon, Los Corozos Lagoon, and the Atlantic Ocean with its respective beaches and estuaries.

History

Colonial
In 1760, San Mateo de Cangrejos is founded and later is named Santurce. It was originally settled by the native Arawak and later by slaves of African ancestry who arrived from neighboring islands now known as the Danish West Indies. Throughout the centuries, the district continued to grow due to its location between San Juan and its southern suburbs.

Spanish influence
In 1876, an engineer from the port town of Santurtzi in Spain's autonomous Basque Country region known as Pablo Ubarri arrived on the island to help in the construction of a railroad system and a steam tramway between San Juan and the town of Río Piedras through the center of San Mateo de Cangrejos which prompted the gentrification of the district. Many years after his arrival he was granted the title of Count of Santurce (which is the Hispanicized equivalent of Santurtzi) by the Spanish Crown. With his newly acquired title and influence, the district was renamed after his title (a decision that has caused controversy ever since). The tourist district of Condado within Santurce also received its present-name from Ubarri's title, as the district's name literally translates to "county" (which in medieval tradition is land granted by a monarch to a count).

Treaty of Paris (1898)
The Treaty of Paris provided that Cuba would become independent from Spain but the U.S. Congress made sure it would be under U.S. control through the Platt Amendment. It ceded Puerto Rico to the United States, along with other adjacent islands then under Spanish sovereignty in the Caribbean, as well as Guam and the Philippines in Asia-Pacific region.

The United States Army established Camp Las Casas, in the area of Las Casas in 1904. The camp was the main training base of the Porto Rico Regiment of Infantry (on January 15, 1899, the military government changed the name of Puerto Rico to Porto Rico and on May 17, 1932, U.S. Congress changed the name back to "Puerto Rico") The Porto Rico Regiment of Infantry was a U.S. Army Regiment which was later renamed the "65th Infantry Regiment". The 65th Infantry Regiment was not segregated, it was a Regular Army Regiment that accepted personnel of every race but blacks, there was a black Regiment in the Island for that purpose, the 375th Regiment. The base continued in operation until 1946, when it was finally closed and the Residencial Las Casas now stands.

Puerto Rico was ceded by Spain in the aftermath of the Spanish–American War under the terms of the Treaty of Paris of 1898 and became an unincorporated territory of the United States. In 1899, the United States Department of War conducted a census of Puerto Rico, finding that the population of Santurce was 5,840.

The 20th century

In the 20th century the conurbation of the San Juan metropolis expanded rapidly beyond its walled confines of Old San Juan to incorporate the boroughs of suburban Miramar, Santurce, Isla Grande, and Condado, along the coast, as well as industrial Hato Rey, with its large sports stadium and modern financial district, and the college town of Río Piedras, immediately to the southeast. Between 1937 and 1948, Santurce along with neighboring district Miramar became one of the most vibrant areas of the capital. However, by the 1970s, most of the district had fallen into decay, losing the luster and vibrancy it once had. Many residents left Santurce, fleeing to the suburbs. By 1980 the San Juan metropolitan area included the surrounding municipalities to the east and west and had about one-third of Puerto Rico's total population; that proportion has grown to two-thirds of the population.

The 21st century
In the early 21st century Santurce saw a period of economic decline coupled with the financial crisis of the local banking & mortgage system. In 2009, the district began a period of cosmopolitan revival and economic growth as many local establishments such as bars, clubs, and restaurants opened their doors due to the importance of trade and tourism. What helped was the decrease in rent, it attracted artists to the area.

Since then, Santurce began experiencing a new wave of gentrification and is now hailed by many as Puerto Rico's "hipster haven". In 2018, twenty-two murals were painted in and around Santurce to illustrate Santurce's culture and history.

Demographics

Santurce is one of the top ten most-populated areas of Puerto Rico. It includes the neighborhoods of Miramar, Loíza, Isla Grande, Barrio Obrero, and Condado, which are cultural hot spots for art, music, cuisine, fashion, hotels, technology, multimedia, film, textile and startups.

It is the most populous borough (barrio) in Puerto Rico and one of the most densely populated areas of San Juan, at 15,447.0 residents per square mile (6,931.2/km2).

Santurce is home to one of the largest Jewish communities in Puerto Rico and the Caribbean with over 1,500 people attending two local synagogues. Jews were officially prohibited from settling in the island through much of its history, but many managed to settle in the island as secret Jews.

Many arrived from France, the Netherlands, Saint-Barthélemy and Curaçao after World War II. A minor portion are descendants of Jewish Cubans who came to establishment after Fidel Castro's Cuban Revolution of 1959. Like in many former Spanish colonies founded soon after the Spanish Inquisition, there are some Puerto Ricans who are Crypto-Jews. Recent DNA ancestry has identified a number of Portuguese descendants who arrived in Puerto Rico after the start of the Portuguese Inquisition in 1536. These are descendants of Converso families. There are some who maintain elements of Jewish traditions, although they themselves are, or were raised as Christians.

Santurce also has a very big Dominican community, along with Cuban, Colombian, Argentine and Chinese communities.

Subdivisions of Santurce
It is subdivided into 40 "subbarrios" (sub-districts).

Population
For centuries "barrios" were the primary administrative division of Puerto Rico's municipalities, however, presently they primarily serve statistical purposes for both the U.S. Census Bureau & the Puerto Rico Planning Board. The most densely populated area lies to the southeast bordering the San José Lagoon and the Martín Peña Channel, while the least densely populated areas are found by the mangrove swamps to the south surrounding the Martín Peña Channel, and the western area of Isla Grande, a decommissioned United States Navy military base.

Cityscape

Architecture
Structures of architectural value and historical importance are located mainly throughout Ponce de León Avenue, Ashford Avenue and Fernández Juncos Avenue.
 Central High School, Spanish Renaissance-style building from 1925: Designed by Adrian Finlayson, Architect (Project I-5)
 Colegio de Arquitectos, 225 Parque Street: Designed by Carlos del Valle Zeno, Architect (link)
 Condado Vanderbilt Hotel, Spanish Revival style hotel from 1919
 Convention Center, Isla Grande Boulevard
 La Casabella, Spanish influence from 1898
 La Concha Resort, a renaissance hotel: Designed by Toro Ferrer, Architects (link)
 Residencia Aboy-Lompré, 1919 house designed by Miguel Ferrer

Public spaces

 La Placita de Santurce: The historical marketplace building, encompassing Campo Alegre, Alto del Cabro, and the Plaza del Mercado (a farmers' market full of local vendors with a social environment, bars, & restaurants), La Placita de Santurce is one of the most popular nightlife areas in San Juan.
La Ventana al Mar (2004): Designed by Andrés Mignucci
 Plaza Antonia Quiñones (also known as Stella-Maris Square and Placita del Condado; 2000); designed by Andrés Mignucci

Beaches
 Condado Bridge Beach
 Ocean Park

Seaport
 Port of San Juan

Transportation
Public transportation is provided by several bus lines (locally known as guaguas) operated by the Puerto Rico Metropolitan Bus Authority and circulate along the main avenues of Ponce de León and Fernández Juncos among others.

In the peripheries of Santurce there is a rapid transit system called Tren Urbano. The Sagrado Corazón station is the terminus of the sole metro system line of San Juan, located in the southeast section of the district in the neighborhood of Martín Peña.
 
Santurce is a few minutes away by car from the country's main airport, Luis Muñoz Marín International Airport, and from San Juan's secondary commercial airport, Isla Grande Airport.

Culture

Museums and galleries
Santurce is the main residence of two major museums on the island.
 the Museum of Art of Puerto Rico
 the Puerto Rico Museum of Contemporary Art
 the Galería Casa Jefferson

Performing arts
 Ballets de San Juan
 Luis A. Ferré Performing Arts Center, modern award-winning fine arts architectural masterpiece

Education

Santurce is home to some of the most prestigious private education institutions in Puerto Rico.
 Conservatory of Music of Puerto Rico
 University of the Sacred Heart
 Academia San Jorge
 Academia Interamericana Metro
 Perpetuo Socorro
 Robinson School
 Saint John's School
It also includes notable public schools:
 Padre Rufo School, bilingual public school
Central High School, built in 1925 and listed on the U.S. National Register of Historic Places

Synagogues and cathedrals

 Episcopal Cathedral of St. John the Baptist (Catedral San Juan Bautista)
 Nuestra Señora de Lourdes Chapel, Neo-Gothic style chapel from 1909 designed by Antonin Nechodoma
 Sagrado Corazon Church (Parada 19)
 Synagogue Shaare Tzadik
 Stella-Maris Catholic Church
 Temple Beth Shalom
 Parroquia San Vicente de Paúl (Parada 24)

Sports
Santurce has the most modern swimming facilities in the Caribbean and fourth in the world. It is an Olympic aquatic sports facility used to host local and international events such as the 2nd A.S.U.A Pan American Masters Swimming Championship. The San Juan Natatorium is located in Santurce's Central Park. 

The district also has a baseball and a basketball team both known as the Santurce Crabbers (Cangrejeros de Santurce) because of the original name of the township. They have been part of the community for over 70 years. Both teams have enjoyed great domestic success, the baseball team is regarded as the ‘New York Yankees of Puerto Rico’, largely in part to the accomplishments of its legendary players, such as Roberto Clemente and Willie Mays.

Health
Santurce has an extensive healthcare network which includes two of the finest hospitals on the island, Ashford Presbyterian Community Hospital and Pavia Hospital.

Economy

Santurce experienced significant economic growth following World War II. During this period the district underwent an economic revitalization. Tourism is also a key industry based on Santurce's proximity to Puerto Rico's main international airport, Luis Muñoz Marín International Airport, and the smaller Fernando Luis Ribas Dominicci Airport. The concentration of hotels are primarily located in the Condado area where there are numerous luxurious hotels including La Concha Resort, Marriott and the Conrad Hotel.

Notable natives and residents
 Miguel Algarín, writer and poet
 Miguel Arteta, film and television director
 Pura Belpré, author
 Giannina Braschi, author
 Tego Calderón, reggaeton singer
 Wilmer Calderon, Puerto Rican-American actor
 Deborah Carthy-Deu, Miss Puerto Rico 1985, Miss Universe 1985; actress, television host
 Lourdes Chacón, actress
 Jessica Cristina, singer
 Carly Colón, professional wrestler and performer
 Christian Daniel, singer-songwriter and actor
 Jack Delano, author and photographer
 Benicio del Toro, actor and producer
 Edgar Diaz, professional baseball player
 José Ferrer, actor, director and producer
 Francisco Figueroa, professional boxer
 Eddie Gómez, bassist
 Wilfredo Gómez, professional boxer
 Sonia Gutierrez, educator, Hispanic rights activist.
 Nathan Leopold, US murderer
 Luis López Nieves, writer
 Gilberto Monroig, singer
 Andy Montañez, salsa singer for El Gran Combo
 Antonin Nechodoma, architect
 Ossie Ocasio, professional boxer
 Cynthia Olavarria, Miss Universe Puerto Rico 2005 and first runner-up Miss Universe 2005
 Carlos Ponce; actor, singer and composer
 Jorge Posada, baseball player (New York Yankees)
 Ismael Rivera, salsa singer & performer
 Ed Romero, baseball player
 Luis Rafael Sánchez, writer
 Daniel Santos, singer and composer
 Arturo Schomburg, writer & historian
 Olga Tañón, singer

See also

 List of communities in Puerto Rico

References

External links
 Official Government Site

 
Historic districts in Puerto Rico
Barrios of San Juan, Puerto Rico